Nauclér is a surname. Notable people with the surname include:

Cecilia Söderberg-Nauclér (born 1967), Swedish immunologist
Elisabeth Nauclér (born 1952), Swedish-born Finnish politician and jurist
Sten-Eggert Nauclér (1914–1990), Swedish Army officer